Uxua López Flamarique (Tafalla, 1983) is a Spanish telecommunications engineer and environmental activist, expert in renewable energy, and a member of an international network of women leaders aiming to build a global collaboration of 10,000 women with backgrounds in STEMM by 2036, an initiative of Homeward Bound.

Biography
López has a degree in Telecommunications Engineering from the Public University of Navarre (UPNA).

She works for Acciona as a telecommunications engineer, in the center which controls approximately 400 renewable energy stations. Having graduated from a program in cyber security, her specialty is managing industrial control systems.

In 2018, López participated in Homeward Bound's Antarctic expedition, an initiative focused on the leadership and empowerment of women in the scientific field, being one of its first Spanish representatives, along with Ana Payo Payo, Alicia Pérez-Porro, and Alexandra Dubini.

Awards and honours

References

1983 births
Living people
Telecommunications engineers
Spanish environmentalists
Public University of Navarre alumni
People from Tafalla (comarca)
Spanish women engineers
Spanish women activists